Allt som jag ser is a song written by Marcos Ubeda, Ulf Georgsson and Lars Diedricson, and performed by Barbados at Melodifestivalen 2001, where it ended up second.

It was also released as a single the same year. At the Swedish singles chart, it peaked at 7th position. It also charted at Svensktoppen for totally six weeks between 21 April-19 May 2001, peaking at fourth position.

It was also recorded in English, as "The Power of Love".

Chart positions

References

2001 singles
Barbados (band) songs
Melodifestivalen songs of 2001
Songs written by Lars Diedricson
2001 songs
Mariann Grammofon singles
Songs written by Marcos Ubeda